is a passenger railway station  located in the city of   Amagasaki Hyōgo Prefecture, Japan. It is operated by the private transportation company Hanshin Electric Railway.

Lines

Layout
The station consists of two opposed elevated side platforms serving two tracks. The ticket gate and concourse are on the 2nd floor, and the platforms are on the 3rd floor.

Platforms

History
Deyashiki Station opened on the Hanshin Main Line on 12 April 1905.

The Hanshin Amagasaki Kaigan Line was abandoned on December 1, 1962.

It was upgraded to an elevated station in January 1994.

Station numbering was introduced on 1 April 2014, with Deyashiki being designated as station number HS-10.

Gallery

History 
Deyashiki Station was opened on April 12, 1905 with the opening of the Hanshin Main Line

Passenger statistics
In fiscal 2020, the station was used by an average of 10,698 passengers daily

Surrounding area
Riberu shopping center
Deyashiki Park
+Kifune Shrine

See also
List of railway stations in Japan

References

External links

 Deyashiki Station website 

Railway stations in Japan opened in 1905
Railway stations in Hyōgo Prefecture
Hanshin Main Line
Amagasaki